Robert Everett may refer to:
 Fats Everett (Robert Ashton Everett, 1915–1969), U.S. Representative from Tennessee
 Robert Everett (computer scientist) (1921–2018), American computer scientist
 Robert W. H. Everett (1901–1942), British World War 2 naval pilot and Grand National winner
 Robert W. Everett (1839–1915), U.S. Representative from Georgia
 Robert Lacey Everett (1833–1916), English farmer and Liberal politician
 Terry Everett (Robert Terry Everett, born 1937), U.S. Representative from Alabama
 Robert Everett (minister) (1791–1875), a leader of the Welsh-speaking abolitionist movement